Maria Bray (1828–1921), was a 19th-century American maritime heroine of an incident during the first days of winter in late 1864. 

Bray was married to Alexander D. Bray (1818-1885), the lighthouse keeper at Thacher Island Light, off Rockport on Massachusetts' Cape Ann.  From December 21 to December 24, 1864, she and her twelve-year-old nephew tended the lights of the station, while her husband was stranded on the mainland, where he had taken an ill co-worker. The Bray family was reunited on Christmas Day.

In 2000, the United States Coast Guard named a coastal buoy tender in her honor.

See also
Coast Guard information page

American lighthouse keepers
Women lighthouse keepers
People from Rockport, Massachusetts
1828 births
1921 deaths
American Universalists
19th-century American women
Place of birth unknown
Female United States Coast Guard personnel